Below is a list and summary of video games that have been Refused Classification (banned) within Australia.

Overview 

Under Australian law, all media intended for retail display, such as films, must be reviewed by the Australian Classification Board (ACB, formerly, the Office of Film and Literature Classification (OFLC) until its dissolution in 2006). A work deemed too inappropriate by the ACB may be Refused Classification (RC), banning it from being sold at retail, and placing the work on the Australian Customs and Border Protection Service list of prohibited items. Any copies of such works found at the border will be seized, and the recipient, depending on the number of copies being imported, may receive up to A$110,000 in fines.

Originally, video games within Australia were only rated up to the MA15+ rating. At the time, the R18+ classification rating could only be given to films, but a video game with content deemed fitting for the R18+ rating would be classified as "Refused Classification" due to an appropriate classification not being available for the medium.

In July and August 2011, all Australian state Attorneys-General except the New South Wales state Attorney-General agreed to instate an R18+ rating for video games, which would be available by the end of 2011. Many games previously refused classification would now fit into the R18+ rating and, if the publisher chose to pay the reclassification fee, would theoretically be able to sell their game in Australia. The date was later changed to allow the rating to be introduced at the beginning of 2013.

With the R18+ rating in place, it is expected fewer video games will be given the Refused Classification rating. Games may still be Refused Classification if deemed to contain material unsuitable for R18+ classification, such as depictions of sexual violence or the promotion of illegal drug use, as well as drug use that is related to incentives and rewards. More specifically, games which may be Refused Classification include:

 Detailed instruction or promotion in matters of crime or violence.
 Depiction of rape.
 The promotion or provision of instruction in paedophile activity.
 Descriptions or depictions of child sexual abuse or any other exploitative or offensive descriptions or depictions involving a person who is, or appears to be, a child under 18 years.
 Gratuitous, exploitative or offensive depictions of:
 (i) violence with a very high degree of impact or which are excessively frequent, prolonged or detailed;
 (ii) cruelty or real violence which are very detailed or which have an extremely high impact;
 (iii) sexual violence
 Depictions of practices such as bestiality
 Gratuitous, exploitative or offensive depictions of:
 (i) activity accompanied by fetishes or practices that are offensive or abhorrent;
 (ii) incest fantasies or other fantasies that are offensive or abhorrent

Classification is compulsory, and games refused classification by the ACB are banned for sale, hire or public exhibition, carrying a maximum fine of $275,000 and/or 10 years in jail. It is, however, legal to possess RC games (except in Western Australia and prescribed areas of the Northern Territory).

The list depicted below is of games that are either still banned, or were initially banned but have been edited exclusively for Australia. Some of these games were banned before the introduction of the R18+ category; if some of these games were to be re-rated today, they would likely receive the R18+ rating. The second list is of games that have been eventually released unedited, rating appealed or the worldwide edition later being released uncut and being identical to other countries.

Due to the licensing of the International Age Rating Coalition software for developers to rate their own game, several hundred games have been banned from various app stores and due to said games being relatively minor they will not be listed here.

List of video games refused classification

Current 
The list below includes games where the worldwide edition has been banned for sale in Australia because either the game has been refused classification or a classification has been revoked. Games in this list with a current classification are available for purchase in a censored or altered form.

Overturned 
The list below includes games where the Australian edition is identical to that of other countries because either: the rating has successfully been appealed, the worldwide edition has later been released in Australia unedited ("uncut"), or the game has received a worldwide edit.

See also
 Australian Classification Board
 Australian Classification Review Board
 List of banned video games
 Censorship in Australia
 Video gaming in Australia

References

External links
 Official website of the Australian Classification Board
 refused-classification.com, an exhaustive database of banned and censored media in Australia

Video games
Australia
Video games banned in Australia
Video games banned in Australia